Fitjar Idrettslag is a Norwegian sports club from Fitjar. It has sections for football, handball, track and field, orienteering, gymnastics, badminton and table tennis.

The club was founded on 6 March 1949. The men's football team currently resides in the Fifth Division (sixth tier). It last played in the Third Division in 2007.

References

Official site

Football clubs in Norway
Association football clubs established in 1949
Sport in Hordaland
Fitjar
Athletics clubs in Norway
1949 establishments in Norway